Michael Krivelevich (born January 30, 1966) is a professor with the School of Mathematical Sciences of Tel Aviv University, Israel.

Krivelevich received his PhD from Tel Aviv University in 1997 under the supervision of Noga Alon. He has published extensively in combinatorics and adjacent fields and specializes in extremal and probabilistic combinatorics.

He serves as an editor-in-chief of the Journal of Combinatorial Theory (Series B) and is on the editorial board of several other journals in the field.

Awards and honors
In 2007, Krivelevich and Alan Frieze won the Pazy Memorial Award for research into probabilistic reasoning in combinatorics.

In 2014, Krivelevich gave an invited address in the Combinatorics section at the International Congress of Mathematicians.

He was elected as a member of the 2017 class of Fellows of the American Mathematical Society "for contributions to extremal and probabilistic combinatorics".

References

External links
 Official home page
 Michael Krivelevich at the Mathematics Genealogy Project

20th-century Israeli mathematicians
21st-century Israeli mathematicians
Academic staff of Tel Aviv University
Combinatorialists
1966 births
Living people
Fellows of the American Mathematical Society